Toba Inlet is one of the lesser, but still principal, inlets of the British Columbia Coast. It is fourth in the series north from the 49th parallel which begins with Burrard Inlet, which is the harbour for the city of Vancouver. Between it and Jervis Inlet to its east, however, there is a freshwater fjord, Powell Lake, which has been augmented by a small hydro project to supply power to the large pulp mill at Powell River, the principal town of the Malaspina Peninsula of the upper Sunshine Coast. Klahoose 1 Reserve, of the Klahoose First Nation is at the mouth of Toba River at the Head of Toba Inlet. Toba Inlet and the Toba Valley is home to many grizzly bears.

Geography

History
The first non-indigenous exploration of Toba Inlet occurred in 1792 when British and Spanish expeditions arrived in the area simultaneously. There was cooperation between the British under George Vancouver and the Spanish under Dionisio Alcalá Galiano. From a base of operation in Desolation Sound boats were sent out to explore the region. On June 25, 1792, Vancouver proposed sending out three parties in boats. The Spanish offered to take on one of the three, this being the investigation of Toba Inlet. Caytetano Valdés left with a boat party early on June 25, and returned on June 27, having determined that the inlet was closed. He described it as being of great depth, with steep shores and high peaks around. On its east shore Valdés found a plank ("tabla" in Spanish) covered with paintings, which he described as "hieroglyphics of the natives". There were several empty villages. The Spanish encountered no inhabitants. Valdés named the inlet after the plank he found, Canal de la Tabla. The British examined the inlet just after Valdés, confirming for themselves the Spanish report. Vancouver kept the Spanish name, which a Spanish map engraver's mistake had changed to its present form of Toba Inlet.

Toba Inlet's Coast Salish name is Yekwamen (phonetic) or yɛkʷamɛn (orthography).

See also
 List of fjords in Canada
 Albert Ostman

References

External links

Fjords of British Columbia
Sunshine Coast (British Columbia)
Spanish history in the Pacific Northwest
Inlets of British Columbia
Salish Sea